Scott LaValla (born July 4, 1988 in Olympia WA) is a retired American rugby union player. LaValla played lock for Stade Français in the Top 14 from 2011 until his retirement in 2015.

Early life
Scott first started playing rugby at age 16. He attended North Thurston High School in Lacey, WA. He went on to play for the Budd Bay Barbarians U-19 team and then the Pacific NW Loggers U-19.

Scott represented the Ulster Ravens during the 2009-10 season.

LaValla played his club rugby for Dublin University Football Club (the Trinity College Dublin rugby club) and was elected Club Captain for the 2010–2011 season. He led his side to a 31-22 win in the annual Dublin Universities Colours match over University College Dublin R.F.C., and led DUFC to victory in the 2010–2011 club rugby sevens tournament. LaValla studied Philosophy and Political Science while at Trinity College Dublin.

International
LaValla made the USA U-19 team in 2007 that competed in the Freedom Cup and IRB Junior World Cup. He played at the U20 level in February 2008 against Canada. In 2008 he captained the U-20 side that played in Ireland.

LaValla's international test debut for the men's national team was the 2010 Churchill Cup, where he played three matches. He was selected to tour with the USA Eagles squad for the Autumn 2010 tour of Europe. LaValla was included the USA squad for the 2011 Rugby World Cup.
On June 9, 2012 LaValla scored his first try for the Eagles in a 28-25 losing effort against Canada.

LaValla did not appear for the U.S. at the 2015 Rugby World Cup due to a broken elbow. He retired from rugby at the end of 2015.

References

External links
 Player Profile eaglesxv.com
 Player Profile USA Rugby
 Dublin University Football Club
 

1988 births
Living people
American rugby union players
Stade Français players
United States international rugby union players
Rugby union locks